Cannabinoid receptor type 1 (CB1), also known as cannabinoid receptor 1, is a G protein-coupled cannabinoid receptor that in humans is encoded by the CNR1 gene. The human CB1 receptor is expressed in the peripheral nervous system and central nervous system. It is activated by: endocannabinoids, a group of retrograde neurotransmitters that include anandamide and 2-arachidonoylglycerol (2-AG); plant phytocannabinoids, such as the compound THC which is an active ingredient of the psychoactive drug cannabis; and, synthetic analogs of THC. CB1 is antagonized by the phytocannabinoid tetrahydrocannabivarin (THCV).

The primary endogenous agonist of the human CB1 receptor is anandamide.

Structure 
The CB1 receptor shares the structure characteristic of all G-protein-coupled receptors, possessing seven transmembrane domains connected by three extracellular and three intracellular loops, an extracellular N-terminal tail, and an intracellular C-terminal tail. The receptor may exist as a homodimer or form heterodimers or other GPCR oligomers with different classes of G-protein-coupled receptors. Observed heterodimers include A2A–CB1, CB1–D2, OX1–CB1, μOR–CB1, while many more may only be stable enough to exist in vivo. The CB1 receptor possesses an allosteric modulatory binding site.

Mechanism
The CB1 receptor is a pre-synaptic heteroreceptor that modulates neurotransmitter release when activated in a dose-dependent, stereoselective and pertussis toxin-sensitive manner. The CB1 receptor is activated by cannabinoids, generated naturally inside the body (endocannabinoids) or introduced into the body as cannabis or a related synthetic compound.

Research suggests that the majority of CB1 receptors are coupled through Gi/o proteins. Upon activation, CB1 receptor exhibits its effects mainly through activation of Gi, which decreases intracellular cAMP concentration by inhibiting its production enzyme, adenylate cyclase, and increases mitogen-activated protein kinase (MAP kinase) concentration. Alternatively, in some rare cases CB1 receptor activation may be coupled to Gs proteins, which stimulate adenylate cyclase. cAMP is known to serve as a second messenger coupled to a variety of ion channels, including the positively influenced inwardly rectifying potassium channels (=Kir or IRK), and calcium channels, which are activated by cAMP-dependent interaction with such molecules as protein kinase A (PKA), protein kinase C (PKC), Raf-1, ERK, JNK, p38, c-fos, c-jun, and others.

In terms of function, the inhibition of intracellular cAMP expression shortens the duration of pre-synaptic action potentials by prolonging the rectifying potassium A-type currents, which is normally inactivated upon phosphorylation by PKA. This inhibition grows more pronounced when considered with the effect of activated CB1 receptors to limit calcium entry into the cell, which does not occur through cAMP but by a direct G-protein-mediated inhibition. As presynaptic calcium entry is a requirement for vesicle release, this function will decrease the transmitter that enters the synapse upon release. The relative contribution of each of these two inhibitory mechanisms depends on the variance of ion channel expression by cell type.

The CB1 receptor can also be allosterically modulated by synthetic ligands  in a positive and negative manner. In vivo exposure to THC impairs long-term potentiation and leads to a reduction of phosphorylated CREB.

The signaling properties of activated CB1 are furthermore modified by the presence of SGIP1, that hinders receptor internalization and decreases ERK1/2 signalling while augmenting the interaction with GRK3, β-arrestin-2.

In summary, CB1 receptor activity has been found to be coupled to certain ion channels, in the following manner:
 Positively to inwardly rectifying and A-type outward potassium channels.
 Negatively to D-type outward potassium channels
 Negatively to N-type and P/Q-type calcium channels.

Expression
The CB1 receptor is encoded by the gene CNR1, located on human chromosome 6. Two transcript variants encoding different isoforms have been described for this gene. CNR1 orthologs have been identified in most mammals.

The CB1 receptor is expressed pre-synaptically at both glutaminergic and GABAergic interneurons and, in effect, acts as a neuromodulator to inhibit release of glutamate and GABA. Repeated administration of receptor agonists may result in receptor internalization and/or a reduction in receptor protein signalling.

The inverse agonist MK-9470 makes it possible to produce in vivo images of the distribution of CB1 receptors in the human brain with positron emission tomography.

Brain

CB1 receptors are expressed most densely in the central nervous system and are largely responsible for mediating the effects of cannabinoid binding in the brain. Endocannabinoids released by a depolarized neuron bind to CB1 receptors on pre-synaptic glutamatergic and GABAergic neurons, resulting in a respective decrease in either glutamate or GABA release. Limiting glutamate release causes reduced excitation, while limiting GABA release suppresses inhibition, a common form of short-term plasticity in which the depolarization of a single neuron induces a reduction in GABA-mediated inhibition, in effect exciting the postsynaptic cell.

Varying levels of CB1 expression can be detected in the olfactory bulb, cortical regions (neocortex, pyriform cortex, hippocampus, and amygdala), several parts of basal ganglia, thalamic and hypothalamic nuclei, and other subcortical regions (e.g., the septal region), cerebellar cortex, and brainstem nuclei (e.g., the periaqueductal gray).

Hippocampal formation
CB1 mRNA transcripts are abundant in GABAergic interneurons of the hippocampus, indirectly reflecting the expression of these receptors and elucidating the established effect of cannabinoids on memory. These receptors are densely located in cornu ammonis pyramidal cells, which are known to release glutamate. Cannabinoids suppress the induction of LTP and LTD in the hippocampus by inhibiting these glutamatergic neurons. By reducing the concentration of glutamate released below the threshold necessary to depolarize the postsynaptic receptor NMDA, a receptor known to be directly related to the induction of LTP and LTD, cannabinoids are a crucial factor in the selectivity of memory.
These receptors are highly expressed by GABAergic interneurons as well as glutamatergic principal neurons. However, a higher density is found within GABAergic cells. This means that, although synaptic strength/frequency, and thus potential to induce LTP, is lowered, net hippocampal activity is raised. In addition, CB1 receptors in the hippocampus indirectly inhibit the release of acetylcholine. This serves as the modulatory axis opposing GABA, decreasing neurotransmitter release. Cannabinoids also likely play an important role in the development of memory through their neonatal promotion of myelin formation, and thus the individual segregation of axons.

Basal ganglia
CB1 receptors are expressed throughout the basal ganglia and have well-established effects on movement in rodents. As in the hippocampus, these receptors inhibit the release of glutamate or GABA transmitter, resulting in decreased excitation or reduced inhibition based on the cell they are expressed in. Consistent with the variable expression of both excitatory glutamate and inhibitory GABA interneurons in both the basal ganglia's direct and indirect motor loops, synthetic cannabinoids are known to influence this system in a dose-dependent triphasic pattern. Decreased locomotor activity is seen at both higher and lower concentrations of applied cannabinoids, whereas an enhancement of movement may occur upon moderate dosages. However, these dose-dependent effects have been studied predominately in rodents, and the physiological basis for this triphasic pattern warrants future research in humans. Effects may vary based on the site of cannabinoid application, input from higher cortical centers, and whether drug application is unilateral or bilateral.

Cerebellum and neocortex
The role of the CB1 receptor in the regulation of motor movements is complicated by the additional expression of this receptor in the cerebellum and neocortex, two regions associated with the coordination and initiation of movement. Research suggests that anandamide is synthesized by Purkinje cells and acts on presynaptic receptors to inhibit glutamate release from granule cells or GABA release from the terminals of basket cells. In the neocortex, these receptors are concentrated on local interneurons in cerebral layers II-III and V-VI. Compared to rat brains, humans express more CB1 receptors in the cerebral cortex and amygdala and less in the cerebellum, which may help explain why motor function seems to be more compromised in rats than humans upon cannabinoid application.

Spine
Many of the documented analgesic effects of cannabinoids are based on the interaction of these compounds with CB1 receptors on spinal cord interneurons in the superficial levels of the dorsal horn, known for its role in nociceptive processing. In particular, the CB1 is heavily expressed in layers 1 and 2 of the spinal cord dorsal horn and in lamina 10 by the central canal. Dorsal root ganglion also express these receptors, which target a variety of peripheral terminals involved in nociception. Signals on this track are also transmitted to the periaqueductal gray (PAG) of the midbrain. Endogenous cannabinoids are believed to exhibit an analgesic effect on these receptors by limiting both GABA and glutamate of PAG cells that relate to nociceptive input processing, a hypothesis consistent with the finding that anandamide release in the PAG is increased in response to pain-triggering stimuli.

Other
CB1 is expressed on several types of cell in pituitary gland, thyroid gland, and possibly in the adrenal gland. CB1 is also expressed in several cells relating to metabolism, such as fat cells, muscle cells, liver cells (and also in the endothelial cells, Kupffer cells and stellate cells of the liver), and in the digestive tract. It is also expressed in the lungs and the kidney.

CB1 is present on Leydig cells and human sperms. In females, it is present in the ovaries, oviducts myometrium, decidua, and placenta. It has also been implicated in the proper development of the embryo.

CB1 is also expressed in the retina. In the retina, they are expressed in the photoreceptors, inner plexiform, outer plexiform, bipolar cells, ganglion cells, and retinal pigment epithelium cells. In the visual system, cannabinoids agonist induce a dose dependent modulation of calcium, chloride and potassium channels. This alters vertical transmission between photoreceptor, bipolar and ganglion cells. Altering vertical transmission in turn results in the way vision is perceived.

Use of antagonists
Selective CB1 agonists may be used to isolate the effects of the receptor from the CB2 receptor, as most cannabinoids and endocannabinoids bind to both receptor types.
CB1 selective antagonists are used for weight reduction and smoking cessation (see Rimonabant). A substantial number of antagonists of the CB1 receptor have been discovered and characterized. TM38837 has been developed as a CB1 receptor antagonist that is restricted to targeting only peripheral CB1 receptors.

Ligands

Agonists 
 Minocycline
Dronabinol

Selective 
 Epigallocatechin
 Epicatechin
 Kavain
 Yangonin
 Oleamide

Unspecified efficacy 
 N-Arachidonoyl dopamine
 Cannabinol
 HU-210
 11-Hydroxy-THC
 Levonantradol

Partial

Endogenous
 2-Arachidonyl glyceryl ether

Phyto/synthetic
 JWH-073
 Tetrahydrocannabinol
 Hexahydrocannabinol

Full

Endogenous
 2-Arachidonoylglycerol

Phyto/synthetic
 AM-2201
 CP 55,940
 JWH-018
 WIN 55,212-2

Allosteric agonist 
 GAT228

Antagonists 
 Cannabigerol
 Ibipinabant
 Otenabant
 Tetrahydrocannabivarin
 Virodhamine (Endogenous CB1 antagonist and CB2 agonist)

Inverse agonists
 Rimonabant
 Taranabant
 INV-202

Allosteric modulators 

 Lipoxin A4 – endogenous, PAM
 ZCZ-011 – PAM
 Pregnenolone – endogenous, NAM
 Cannabidiol – NAM
 Fenofibrate – NAM
 GAT100 – NAM
 PSNCBAM-1 – NAM
 RVD-Hpα – NAM

Binding affinities

Evolution
The CNR1 gene is used in animals as a nuclear DNA phylogenetic marker. This intronless gene has first been used to explore the phylogeny of the major groups of mammals, and contributed to reveal that placental orders are distributed into five major clades: Xenarthra, Afrotheria, Laurasiatheria, Euarchonta, and Glires.  CNR1 has also proven useful at lower taxonomic levels, such as rodents, and for the identification of dermopterans as the closest primate relatives.

See also 
 Discovery and development of Cannabinoid Receptor 1 Antagonists
 Cannabinoid receptor
 Cannabinoid receptor type 2 (CB2)

References

External links 
 
 Cannabinoid receptor 1 (CNR1) Human Protein Atlas

G protein-coupled receptors